The New Daily was a minor newspaper in the United Kingdom. It was edited from April 1960 by the political activist Edward Martell, and was associated with his National Fellowship party founded in 1962. The paper took an anti–trade union stance and reached a circulation of 100,000.

Its dates of publication were 1960 to 1967, according to one national library that holds copies.

References

Daily newspapers published in the United Kingdom
Defunct newspapers published in the United Kingdom
National newspapers published in the United Kingdom
1960 establishments in the United Kingdom
1967 disestablishments in the United Kingdom